Jutta Gerta Armgard von Ditfurth (born 29 September 1951) is a German sociologist, writer, and radical ecologist politician. Born into the noble house of Ditfurth, members of which had been noble ministeriales invested with hereditary administrative titles and offices in various regions of today's Saxony-Anhalt and Lower Saxony and elsewhere in the Holy Roman Empire, a daughter of the German physician and science journalist Hoimar von Ditfurth and a sister of the historian Christian von Ditfurth, in 1978 she attempted to have her name legally changed to remove the nobiliary particle "von" and to become the plainer Jutta Ditfurth, but was refused the change by the authorities. She is nonetheless known throughout Germany by her adopted non-noble name, which she prefers.

Early life 

Ditfurth studied art history, sociology, political science, economic history, and philosophy in Germany, Scotland, and the US, at the universities of Heidelberg, Hamburg, Freiburg, Glasgow, Detroit, and Bielefeld, graduating as a sociologist in 1977. After her final graduation, she worked as a sociologist, journalist, and writer, and also as a shift worker.

Politics 

She has been politically active within the New Left since the early 1970s, joining internationalist and feminist groups, as well as participating in the nascent Green and anti-nuclear movement. In 1980, she became member of the newfounded German Green Party and from 1984 till 1988 she was one of the three party leaders.
In December 1988 the national convention ("Bundesdelegiertenkonferenz") of the party voted with 214 to 186 delegates to end Ditfurths leadership.
Towards the late 1980s, she became highly critical of the subsequent trajectory of the German Green Party, which she described as counterrevolutionary, hierarchical, and nepotistic; she left the Greens in 1991.

As a candidate on an international list of the Greek Left-wing party New Left Current during the 1999 European elections, she ran a campaign critical of the military German and NATO involvement in the Kosovo War, but did not win enough votes to win a seat in the European Parliament. In 2000, she co-founded the minor German party Ecological Left, of which she remains a member and on whose ticket she won a seat in the city parliament of Frankfurt in 2001 and 2011. In 2007, she published a biography of the Red Army Faction member Ulrike Meinhof.

She is currently based in Frankfurt. Her works remain largely untranslated into English.

Publications 
 Der Baron, die Juden und die Nazis. Reise in eine Familiengeschichte. ("The Baron, the Jews, and the Nazis: Journey Into a Family History"), Hoffmann und Campe, Hamburg, 2013,  (on her family ties to Nazism prior to 1945)
 
 
 

 [German] (on the political trajectory of the Green Party which she criticizes ever since leaving them)

References

External links 
 Official website (in German)

1951 births
Writers from Würzburg
Living people
German women writers